The fourth season of the Canadian television comedy series Video on Trial premiered on MuchMusic on September 8, 2008 and concluded on August 31, 2009. It consists of 26 episodes.

Background
Video on Trial features music videos being humorously critiqued in a manner akin to a courtroom trial. The show's tongue-in-cheek manifesto, as announced in its original opening sequence, is seeing to it that "all music videos are brought to justice". A typical half-hour episode features five music videos being "tried" by a panel of five personalities acting as jurors.

Production
In this season, each episode commences with a roll call of the jury and a reading of the docket of accused music videos, with the remainder of the episode being dedicated to the trials for each video. The specific charges leveled at a video are announced at the beginning of its trial, and a final verdict for the artist of the video is presented at the conclusion of the trial.

Episodes

References

2008 Canadian television seasons
2009 Canadian television seasons